"Living in a Child's Dream" is a song by Australian rock group, the Masters Apprentices. It was released in August 1967 on Astor Records as the lead single from the band's second EP The Masters Apprentices Vol. 2. The track was written by the group's guitarist, Mick Bower. It peaked at No. 9 on the Go-Set national singles charts.

Background 
In February 1967 the Masters Apprentices relocated to Melbourne from Adelaide, and in June they issued their debut self-titled album on Astor Records. It was recorded at the newly-opened Armstrong Studios in South Melbourne and was nominally produced by staff producer, Dick Heming. According to lead singer, Jim Keays, Heming's input was limited and most of the production was by audio engineer, Roger Savage, with considerable input from Ian Meldrum. 

In August 1967 the band released "Living in a Child's Dream" which reached the top ten in most state capitals and peaked at No. 9 on Go-Set'''s National Top 40.

The track was written by the group's guitarist, Mick Bower. Australian musicologist, Ian McFarlane, described it as "blissful psychedelic pop." Fellow music journalist, Ed Nimmervoll, opined that it "saw the first dramatic shift in direction for the [band], this time offering a melodic pop piece with psychedelic lyrics. With a national top ten hit on their hands [they] were now one of the most popular groups in the country." It was voted Australian Song of the Year by Go-Set'' readers.

Track listing

Personnel 

The Masters Apprentices
 Mick Bower – rhythm guitar
 Steve Hopgood – drums
 Jim Keays – lead vocals, harmonica
 Tony Summers – lead guitar
 Gavin Webb – bass guitar

Recording
 Producer – Dick Heming, Roger Savage, Ian Meldrum
 Engineer – Roger Savage

References 

General
  Note: limited preview for on-line version.
 
  Note: Archived [on-line] copy has limited functionality.
  Note: [on-line] version was established at White Room Electronic Publishing Pty Ltd in 2007 and was expanded from the 2002 edition. As from September 2010 the [on-line] version is no longer available.

Specific

1967 singles
Songs about children
Songs about nostalgia